Charles Simms (January 24, 1928 – October 10, 2003) was an American gymnast. He competed at the 1952 Summer Olympics and the 1956 Summer Olympics.

References

External links
 

1928 births
2003 deaths
American male artistic gymnasts
Olympic gymnasts of the United States
Gymnasts at the 1952 Summer Olympics
Gymnasts at the 1956 Summer Olympics
Sportspeople from New York City